MOL Plc., also commonly known as MOL Group, is a Hungarian multinational oil and gas company headquartered in Budapest, Hungary. Members of MOL Group include among others the Croatian and Slovak formerly state-owned oil and gas companies, INA and Slovnaft. MOL is Hungary's most profitable enterprise, with net profits of $770 million in 2019. The company is also the third most valuable company in Central and Eastern Europe and placed 402 on the Fortune Global 500 list of the world's largest companies in 2013 with a revenue equal to one fifth of Hungary's GDP at the time.

As of October 2021, the largest shareholder is the Mol New Europe Foundation with 10.49% ahead of Maecenas Universitatis Corvini Foundation and Mathias Corvinus Collegium Foundation, both with 10%, OmanOil Budapest with 7.14% and OTP and ING Bank with 4.9% and 4.48% respectively. Nearly 45% of shares are free floated.

MOL is vertically integrated and is active in every area of the oil and gas industry, including exploration and production, refining, distribution and marketing, petrochemicals, power generation, trading and retail. As of 2021, MOL has operations in over 30 countries worldwide, employs 25,000 people, has 2,000 service stations in nine countries (mainly in Central and Eastern Europe) under six brands, and is a market leader in Hungary, Slovakia, Croatia and Bosnia Herzegovina. MOL's downstream operations in Central Eastern Europe manufacture and sell products such as fuels, lubricants, additives and petrochemicals. The company's most significant areas of operations are Central and Eastern Europe, Southern Europe, North Sea, Middle East, Africa, Pakistan, Russia and Kazakhstan.

MOL has a primary listing on the Budapest Stock Exchange and is a constituent of the BUX Index. As of October 2021, it has a market capitalization of $6 billion and is the second largest company listed on the Budapest Stock Exchange. MOL also has a secondary listing on the Warsaw Stock Exchange.

History

Foundation (1994–1995) 
On 1 October 1991, MOL was established as a legal successor, merging nine former members of the National Oil and Gas Trust, which had been established in 1957. By 1995, the actual integration of companies was completed, and the previously separated entities started to operate within one joint organization. MOL decided on a privatization strategy, in order to respond to international market, political and legal challenges, which the company was facing following the turmoil of the end of the Soviet Union. It thus became a pioneer in the regional consolidation of the oil and gas industry.

Regional expansion (1995–2001) 
In 1995, the company first expanded across national borders, opening filling stations in Transylvania, Romania. In the following years MOL continued to expand, and in 2000 acquired a 36% stake in Slovnaft, Slovakia's national oil company. The company thus became the first oil company in Central Europe to establish a cross-border partnership and also launched a new business branch by procuring 32.9% of Hungary's petrochemical company TVK.

In 1999, MOL entered Pakistan, becoming the operator of TAL Block (with 8.42% stake in production), one of the largest hydrocarbon producing blocks of the country.

International expansion (2002–2007) 
As a result of the 2002 INA Privatization Act, the open public tender for the privatization of a 25%+1 share stake in INA, Croatia's national oil company, was launched in May 2002. MOL won the tender with a bid of $505 million against OMV's offer of $420 million.

By 2004, MOL had fully acquired, in several steps, Slovakia's national refiner Slovnaft, and Hungary's leading producer of ethylene and polypropylene TVK, over which MOL gained control with increasing their stake to 34.5% in 2001. Subsequently, MOL further increased its stake in TVK to 86.56% in 2006.  In 2015, MOL then raised its shareholding in TVK to 100%.

Between 2003 and 2005, MOL had acquired all Shell filling stations in Romania. In 2004, MOL entered the Austrian market by purchasing a fuel storage facility in Korneuburg, and a year later acquired the Roth filling station chain.  In August 2007, MOL purchased Italiana Energia e Servizi S.p.A. (IES), owner of the Mantua refinery and a chain of 165 retail stations in Italy.

International expansion II (2007–2016) 
In 2007, MOL entered the Kurdistan Region of Iraq, where its subsidiary MOL Kalegran owns 20% in Shaikan PSC. Further in 2009, MOL acquired a 10% stake in the Pearl Petroleum consortium (Pearl) from Crescent Petroleum and Dana Gas PJSC.

In November 2007, MOL reported a new regional initiative to create a joint regional gas pipeline system called New European Transmission System (NETS). On 20 December 2007, MOL announced a strategic cooperation with Czech power utility CEZ. The joint venture with CEZ focuses on gas-fired power generation and related gas infrastructure in Central and Southeastern Europe, first launching two 800 MW power plants in Hungary and Slovakia.  After selling 7% of its shares to CEZ within the scopes of a strategic partnership, MOL announced on 10 March 2008 the sale of an 8% stake to the Oman Oil Company for the same reason.

On 9 May 2008, MOL signed an agreement to acquire a 35% interest in a block in India operated by the Indian ONGC. In the same year MOL further acquired 22.16% of INA's shares through its general public offer on the Zagreb Stock Exchange.

On 24 May 2011, the second Orbán-cabinet bought the Russian Surgutneftegas's shares, thus the Hungarian state acquired 21.2% of the shares within the company.

In late 2013, MOL entered the North Sea by acquiring Wintershall’s portfolio, which included a mix of producing fields and undeveloped projects. It also acquired a position in the Scott hub in the central North Sea. MOL further expanded its exploration portfolio by entering Norway in 2015, after acquiring Ithaca Petroleum Norge.

On May 8, 2014, MOL announced the acquisition of the Italian Eni’s subsidiaries in the Czech Republic, Slovakia and Romania, including the retail network of 208 petrol stations previously operated under the Agip brand. The transaction also included the takeover of Eni's wholesale interests in the Czech Republic, Slovakia and Romania. In the Czech Republic, MOL's retail market share exceeded 10 percent thanks to 125 new gas stations and 24 Slovnaft and 125 PAP Oil filling stations, also belonging to the group. With 274 service stations, the MOL Group is the second largest retailer of fuel in the country. In Slovakia, 253 petrol stations were already part of the entire network, with 41 filling stations purchased at the time. In Romania, the existing network expanded by 42 wells, adding 189 items, accounting for 12% of retail sales.

Diversification (2016–2021) 
In 2016, MOL announced its new long-term strategy MOL 2030 in response to expected fossil fuel peak demand. According to the company, its integrated upstream-downstream business model would continue to provide stable and robust profitability for the next 10-15 years, but new investments are seen to be essential for MOL’s future. As part of the strategy, the company intends to diversify the classical Oil & Gas business and develop into the region’s leading chemical and consumer goods and services company. According to Wall Street Journal, "MOL has a transformation plan that is among the most explicit responses to the trend, indicating how the landscape may change for big energy providers over the next decade."

Through 2030, MOL scheduled investments of US$4.5 billion to expand its petrochemical business and to extend away from the commodity segment into higher value-added chemical products. One of the first projects following the new strategy was the Polyol chemical project. In September 2018, MOL reached final investment on the project and signed engineering, procurement and construction (EPC) contracts with ThyssenKrupp.

In October 2019, the foundation stone for the complex in Tiszaújváros, Hungary, was laid by Zsolt Hernádi, Ferenc Koncz, Sami Pelkonen and Mihály Varga. The plant is scheduled to be fully operational by 2021.

As part of MOL 2030, the company has also begun to build up its recycling capabilities and formed a partnership for plastic recycling with German APK in 2018, and in 2019 acquired Aurora, a German recycled plastic compounding company.

As part of its retail strategy, MOL aims to become a fast-moving consumer goods (FMCG) retailer and reshape the transportation in Central Eastern Europe. By 2030, the company's goal is to double its consumer services EBITDA (comparing to 2017) from 15% to 30%. In 2017, MOL launched fleet management, e-mobility and car sharing ventures.

In September 2019, MOL Serbia opened a new fuel storage depot in Sremski Karlovci. With total investments in Serbia exceeding €500 million, the facility will be used to store and process fuels for the currently 62 gas stations in the country. The compound is MOL's largest investment into Serbia over the last 15 years. In the same month, more than 100 recently graduated young professionals from 18 nationalities started their career at MOL Group's Growww program.

In November 2019, MOL signed an agreement with Chevron, acquiring their 9.57% interest in the Azeri-Chirag-Gunashli (ACG) oil field, one of the world's largest oil fields that is located in the Caspian Sea, and an 8.9% stake in the Baku-Tbilisi-Ceyhan (BTC) pipeline. The pipeline transports crude oil from ACG to the Mediterranean port of Ceyhan. The total transaction was valued at $1.57 billion.

In November 2019, MOL Group announced it had acquired 100% shareholding in German plastic compounder company Aurora.

At the start of the pandemic in March 2020, MOL shifted production of windshield washer at its Almásfüzitő plant to hand and surface sanitizers to offer protection against the coronavirus.

In 2014 as a strategic goal, MOL started investigating the solutions of diversifying its crude oil supply and to adapt its refineries to process non-Russian alternative crude oil, in order to reach greater flexibility. Until 2022 MOL invested more than USD 170 million on building up the alternative logistic solution on the Adria pipeline. This allows more seaborne deliveries to supply the Duna and Slovnaft refineries in Hungary and Slovakia. Due to the crude diversification efforts, Duna refinery can currently process about 35% of non-REB feedstock, mixed in with Urals crude. The war in Ukraine has accelerated this process of planning. MOL needs an investment-cycle of up to $700million and at least 2-4 years to be able to switch to 100% alternative crude processing.

MOL Group 2030+ (2021-present) 
In February 2021, The Board of Directors reviewed and approved "Shape Tomorrow" MOL Group 2030+, an update of the company’s long-term strategy, and sustainability strategy. The 2030+ strategy also laid out the plans for the Group’s downstream, upstream and consumer services operations. MOL started to implement the updated strategy right after the publication.

In June 2021, MOL Group reached an agreement to acquire OMV’s 92.25% stake in OMV Slovenija d.o.o., the Slovenian arm of Austrian oil and gas giant OMV AG for €301million.

Corporate affairs

Organizational structure 
MOL has many subsidiaries across all areas of its business operations. Its most important subsidiaries include Slovnaft, INA and MOL Group Italy.

Leadership structure 
MOL Group's chief governing body is the board of directors, which has 10 members, out of which three are executive and seven are non-executive. The three executive members of the board are its Chairman Zsolt Hernádi, who serves as chief executive officer, József Molnár, Group Chief Executive Officer and Oszkár Világi, Group Innovative Businesses and Services Executive Vice President. The supervisory board is led by Zoltán Áldott, who is also the chairman of the supervisory board of Slovnaft.

Shareholder structure 
As of August 2021, MOL's current shareholder structure is:

 26.16% - Foreign investors (mainly institutional)
10.49% - MOL New Europe Foundation
10.00% - Maecenas Universitatis Corvini Foundation
10.00% - Mathias Corvinus Collegium Foundation
7.14% - OmanOil (Budapest) Limited
4.90% - OTP Bank Plc.
1.32% - OTP Fund Management
4.48% - ING Bank N.V.
3.37% - UniCredit Bank AG
1.20% - Commerzbank AG
10.63% - Domestic institutional investors
7.76% - Domestic private investors
2.55% - MOL Plc. (treasury shares)

MOL campus 

In 2017, MOL announced the relocation of their corporate headquarters, which are currently based in various buildings throughout Budapest. The complex consists of a 120m tower, connected podium, buildings and outside spaces, which are designed by Foster + Partners. The campus also entails a public "sky deck" and has state-of-the-art sustainability features, including responsive lighting, heating and ventilation systems, low-carbon energy sources and rainwater harvesting and storage facilities. The campus spans 86,000 sqm at the bank of the Danube and accommodate up to 2,500 people. The tower is the Budapest's highest building and make it the second city in the CEE region to display a building by the British studio.

In June 2019, MOL revealed first interior design visualizations, that were created by the Berlin-based interior design company KINZO.

In December 2022, MOL Campus was opened.

Operations

International upstream operations
MOL Group has a current Upstream presence in 13 countries with production activities in 8. Besides Central and Eastern Europe (Hungary and Croatia), its core regions, MOL has a presence and partnerships in the CIS region (Russia, Kazakhstan), the Middle East, Africa and Pakistan as well as the North Sea region (UK, Norway).

MOL derives nearly three-quarters of its oil and gas production from Hungary and Croatia. Despite the fact that the fields in the CEE are mature, the company has managed to reverse a production decline, with oil production growing by 20% in 2016 thanks to optimization measures (Enhanced Oil Recovery).

The company has a 20% interest in the Catcher area oil and gas block in the North Sea, in company with Premier Oil (50%) and Cairn Energy (30%). In June 2014, the UK Department of Energy and Climate Change gave final approval for the £1 billion development.  First oil was achieved from the field's FPSO (Floating Production Storage and Offloading) in December 2017.

Norway plays an important role in MOL Group's international exploration portfolio. The company entered Norway in 2015, after acquiring Ithaca Petroleum Norge, and is present in three of the North Sea's core areas (Central Graben South, South Viking Graben and Northern North Sea). In late 2018, MOL Norge started its first operated drilling in the Oppdal/Driva prospect.

MOL has foreign exploration licences in (with date of announcement):
Yemen, Exploration Blocks ’48’ and ’49’, 2002
Kazakhstan, Federovskoye Block, 2004 ; North Karpovsky, 2012 
Croatia and Hungary, Slatina and Zaláta, 2006
Russia, Baituganskoe Oilfield, Surgut-7 block and Matjushkinsky block 2006–2007
Cameroon, Ngosso Permit Block, 2007
Iraq, Akri Bijeel Block, 2007

MOL has foreign production facilities in (with date of announcement):
Russia, Zapadno-Malobalyk oil field (with Yukos, later Russneft) 2002
Pakistan, Tal Block, 2004

Downstream operations 
MOL Group operates assets with a total of 20.9 mtpa refining and 2.2 mtpa petrochemicals capacity. Its downstream asset base includes 6 production units: 4 refineries and 2 petrochemical sites, and an extended regional logistics and wholesales network as an integrated value chain. Its refineries at Százhalombatta, Hungary and Bratislava, Slovakia, are among the most profitable ones in Europe, with Nelson complexity indexes of 10,6 and 11,5 respectively.

MOL also produces and sells petrochemicals worldwide and is a leading petrochemical company in the Central Eastern Europe region. Its products are sold in more than 40 countries. MOL's petrochemical portfolio consists of high-quality polyolefin products (high- and low-density polyethylene, polypropylene) as well as butadiene.

As part of its 2030 strategy, MOL targets a gradual increase of the share of valuable non-motor fuel products to above 50% by 2030 from below 30% currently. MOL intends to increase the feedstock for its petrochemical plants, whilst also taking advantage of the growing demand for profitable products as jet fuel, lubricants and base oils.

As MOL aims to expand its petrochemical business, the company has earmarked EUR 1.2bn for investment in propylene-oxide based polyols, a high-value product applied in the automotive industry, packaging and furniture manufacturing. In 2018, it made a final investment decision on its Polyol Project, the biggest single investment of the company until 2021.

To expand their petrochemical portfolio, MOL has signed a partnership with German APK in 2018, supporting the completion of APK's plastic-recycling plant in Merseburg. As part of circular-economy and sustainability endeavors, the plant pilots a process dubbed "Newcycling", recovering high-quality materials from plastic waste.

For the natural gas division, the main focus is gas transmission via an extensive high pressure gas pipeline, which length exceeds .  MOL is a member of the Nabucco Pipeline project.

In the field of renewable energy MOL develops geothermal power production through the, CEGE Central European Geothermal Energy Production, a partnership with Australian-based Green Rock Energy Limited.  The company supports the research of second generation biofuels at the University of Pannonia.

Consumer Services (Retail) 
As of 2018, MOL Group owns a network of nearly 2,000 service stations under six brands across ten countries in Central Eastern Europe: Hungary, Slovakia, Croatia, Romania, Czech Republic, Poland, Serbia, Slovenia, Bosnia and Herzegovina and Montenegro. In reaction to advancements in technology and new consumer habits, and to prepare the company for times beyond the fuel age, the company has set the goal to become a broader goods and services provider.

To reach these goals, MOL has already ventured into new businesses, including e-mobility, car sharing and fleet management, leveraging its 10 million retail customer base. As part of their 2030 strategy, MOL also focuses on e-mobility and alternative fuels. In 2018, the company launched a new car-sharing service in Budapest, MOL Limo.

Awards 
At the 2016 Petroleum Economist Awards, MOL Group was named the Downstream Company of the Year and in 2018, it was awarded the Energy Company of the Year – Mid Cap prize.

Controversies

Takeover attempt by OMV 
In June 2007, Austrian energy company OMV made an unsolicited bid to take over MOL, which has been rejected by the Hungarian company. On 6 March 2008, the European Commission launched an in-depth investigation of OMV's unsolicited bid to take over MOL. On 24 June 2008, OMV received a 'Statement of Objections' from the European Commission regarding the company's attempted takeover of MOL.  In March 2009, OMV sold its 21% stake in MOL to Surgutneftegas. MOL called this move "unfriendly" and claimed OMV had acted as a front for Russian interests.

Surgutneftegas shares 
Following the OMV's sale of its 21% stake of MOL to Surgutneftgas in 2009, MOL refused to register the Russian company as a shareholder with full rights, due to non-transparent ownership structure of Surgutneftegas. As a result, Surgutneftegas did not have its representatives in the board and the right to vote at general assemblies of shareholders. MOL defended its decision to block Surgut by arguing that the Russian company had not made its intentions towards the company clear. In May 2011, the Hungarian government bought the Russian Surgutneftegas's shares, thus the Hungarian state acquired 21.2% of the shares of MOL.

Legal dispute over INA 

In 2011, Croatia started an investigation of ex-prime minister Ivo Sanader for allegedly accepting a €10 million bribe from MOL, in exchange for the Croatian Government approving the First Amendment to the Shareholders Agreement and thus MOL securing management rights, accusing also the company's chairman, Zsolt Hernádi. MOL repeatedly denied all the accusations. Soon after, the Hungarian prosecution launched investigation on suspicion of bribery and in 2012 dismissed allegations of criminal activity in this matter.

Operations in Russia 
According to a list maintained by the Yale School of Management, as of March 2022, the company continues to do business in Russia despite a widespread boycott after the Russian invasion of Ukraine.

See also
List of oil exploration and production companies
List of companies based in Budapest

References

External links
 Official website molgroup.info

Companies based in Budapest
Non-renewable resource companies established in 1957
Companies listed on the Budapest Stock Exchange
Companies listed on the Warsaw Stock Exchange
Hungarian brands
Oil and gas companies of Hungary
Oil pipeline companies
Natural gas pipeline companies
Economy of Hungary
Petrochemical companies
Oil traders
Energy companies established in 1957
1957 establishments in Hungary
Multinational companies headquartered in Hungary